Irving Benson (January 31, 1914 – May 19, 2016) was an American actor and comedian. He was one of the last survivors of the vaudeville era.

Having enjoyed a long and successful run on the east coast American Burlesque circuit, Benson travelled west to play Las Vegas for the first time in 1957, with the Minsky Follies show. Benson gained national exposure during the 1960s, when fellow vaudevillian Milton Berle hired him to play a faux heckler named Sidney Spritzer.

The character would turn up in the balcony overlooking the stage of Berle's variety show (where the studio audience could see him) and banter with Berle about the host's alleged lack of talent and originality. The character was likely the inspiration for The Muppets' Statler and Waldorf. Benson became Johnny Carson's favorite comic and appeared frequently on the Carson-hosted Tonight Show. He was honored for Best Documentary at the 2011 Backlot Film Festival for "The Last First Comic" uncovering the roots of American comedy also going inside the colorful world of the Burlesque show.

Benson married his wife Lillian in November 1936; the 79-year marriage, which lasted until her death in March 2016, remains the longest entertainment industry marriage on record, surpassing Dolores and Bob Hope's 69-year marriage in 2006. Irving and Lillian had two children, and at the time of their death, they were survived by them, five grandchildren and seven great-grandchildren. He turned 100 in January 2014, and died on May 19, 2016 at the age of 102.

Filmography 
 1961: Scanty Panties (Gambler)
 1966: The Milton Berle Show (Sidney Sphritzer)
 1968: The Hollywood Palace (Sidney Sphritzer)
 1970: Which Way to the Front? (German Officer, uncredited)
 1979: Happy Days (Irv Hanson)

References

External links

1914 births
2016 deaths
American centenarians
American male comedians
Jewish American male actors
20th-century American male actors
20th-century American comedians
Men centenarians
21st-century American Jews